Maharaja Agrasen Hospital may refer to:
Maharaja Agrasen Hospital (Bangalore)
Maharaja Agrasen Hospital (New Delhi)